Simon James Mannix (born 10 August 1971 in Lower Hutt, New Zealand) is a former rugby union footballer who now serves as head coach of Pau in the Top 14 having previously worked as backs coach for Munster and Racing Metro. Mannix played one test for the New Zealand national rugby union team against France in 1994. He was educated at St Patrick's College, Silverstream.

Playing career
Mannix played for Wellington, and Wellington Hurricanes in his native New Zealand. Later in his playing career, he moved to Europe and played for Sale Sharks, Gloucester Rugby and Racing Métro 92. He made eight appearances, including one test match, for New Zealand between 1990 and 1994.

Coaching
Mannix was Backs coach for Racing Metro from 2006 until December 2011, when he was dismissed. He was part of the management team that gained the club promotion to the Top 14 in 2009. In 2012, Mannix was appointed backs coach of Munster on a two-year contract from the 2012–13 season under head coach Rob Penney. He was appointed head coach of Pau, then in the Pro D2, for the start of the 2014–2015 season. He went on to top the Pro D2 in his first season, earning the team promotion to the Top 14. In 2019, Mannix was appointed coach of the Singapore rugby team on a three-year contract. He resigned in 2021.

Notes

External links

1971 births
Living people
New Zealand rugby union coaches
New Zealand rugby union players
Rugby union players from Lower Hutt
New Zealand international rugby union players
People educated at St. Patrick's College, Silverstream
Racing 92 coaches
Racing 92 players
Munster Rugby non-playing staff
Sale Sharks players
Gloucester Rugby players